Two Cheers for Anarchism: Six Easy Pieces on Autonomy, Dignity, and Meaningful Work and Play is a 2012 book-length defense of the anarchist perspective, written by anthropologist James C. Scott and published by Princeton University Press.

Further reading

External links 

 
 Full Text

2012 non-fiction books
American non-fiction books
Books about anarchism
Books by James C. Scott
Philosophy books
Princeton University Press books